Odayama-ike Dam  is an earthfill dam located in Hiroshima Prefecture in Japan. The dam is used for irrigation. The catchment area of the dam is 2 km2. The dam impounds about 3  ha of land when full and can store 187 thousand cubic meters of water. The construction of the dam was completed in 1961.

References

Dams in Hiroshima Prefecture